Ferdinand C. Weinert (July 14, 1853 – February 19, 1939) was a merchant and politician from Seguin, Texas, who served in the Texas Legislature, four years in the Senate and four terms in the House, and well as serving as Secretary of State.

Early life and family
Ferdinand C. Weinert  was born in New Braunfels, Texas, on July 14, 1853, raised in Guadalupe County, Texas and schooled in New Braunfels. He married Clara Bading, and had seven children, making his residence in Seguin and Austin, Texas.

Career
 Weinert  worked in various mercantile businesses in New Braunfels, Austin, and San Antonio. He was elected justice of the peace in 1875. Then he became county commissioner and county judge of Guadalupe County. He served in the Texas House 1893-1895, 1903-1905, 1931-1935 and Texas Senate  1909-1913. Weinert was appointed Secretary of State June 1, 1913.
Weinert died on February 19, 1939, and was buried in the family cemetery in Seguin.

Legacy
Weinert, Texas  in Haskell County, Texas is named for Senator Ferdinand C. Weinert of Seguin, who led many Seguin citizens to settle there on a last fragment of the once open frontier.  Weinert, Texas on FM 20, in Guadalupe County is named for the Weinert family. The Weinert House in Seguin is a restored residence of the Senator. F.C.Weinert Bridge, Weinert School and Weinert Street are also located in Seguin, Texas.

References

 Frank W. Johnson, A History of Texas and Texans, 1914 (5 vols., ed. E. C. Barker and E. W. Winkler Chicago and New York: American Historical Society, reprint 1916)
 Frank Carter Adams, ed., Texas Democracy: A Centennial History of Politics and Personalities of the Democratic Party, 1836–1936 (4 vols., Austin: Democratic Historical Association, 1937)

1853 births
1939 deaths
People from Seguin, Texas
Democratic Party Texas state senators
People from San Antonio
People from New Braunfels, Texas
People from Austin, Texas
Secretaries of State of Texas
Businesspeople from Texas
19th-century American politicians
20th-century American politicians